Zhang Xu (born 30 July 1999) is a Chinese footballer currently playing as a midfielder for Henan Jianye.

Club career
Zhang Xu would go abroad to further his football development and would sign for lower league Portuguese side Maia Lidador where he would make his debut as a senior on 26 August 2018 against Avintes in a 0-0 draw. At the end of the season, Zhang would return to China and joined top tier club Henan Jianye where he would make his debut in a Chinese FA Cup game on 1 May 2019 against Guangzhou Evergrande in a 2-0 defeat where he came on as a substitute for Yang Guoyuan.

Career statistics

References

External links

1999 births
Living people
Chinese footballers
Chinese expatriate footballers
Association football midfielders
Campeonato de Portugal (league) players
Chinese Super League players
Gondomar S.C. players
Henan Songshan Longmen F.C. players
Chinese expatriate sportspeople in Portugal
Expatriate footballers in Portugal